Jalan Pekan Gurney (Perak state route A125) is a State road in Perak, Malaysia.

List of junctions

References

External links
Perak State Road Transport Department

Pekan Gurney